Nqobile "Nunu" Khumalo (born 15 April 1992), is a South African actress and model. She is best known for her roles in the television serials Isibaya, Soul City and Scandal!.

Personal life
Nqobile Khumalo was born on 15 April 1992 in Mpumalanga, South Africa to a Swazi family. When she was two months old, her family moved to Johannesburg.

She attended St. Mary's Diocesan School for her secondary education. Khumalo then joined the Midrand Graduate Institute and completed a Bachelor of Arts in Journalism degree.

Career
In 2013, Khumalo made her maiden television appearance in the first season of popular television series Isibaya where she played the role of Cindy. In 2016, she played the role of Hlengiwe Twala in the e.tv daily drama series Scandal!.

In 2019, Khumalo won an International Award for Best African Actress by New Vision International Film Festival held in Amsterdam, Netherlands.

Khumalo has also acted in the television series Soul City where she played the popular role of Relebogile "Riri" Diholo.

Filmography

 Isibaya as Cindy
 Broken Vows as Zandile 
 High Rollers as Thandi 
 Gauteng Maboneng as Beautiful lady 
 Loxion Lyric as Nhlahla 
 Mfolozi Street as Judith 
 Saints and Sinners as Lerato 
 Madiba as African woman in a red hut 
 Rockville as Nosipho 
 She's The One as herself 
 The Herd as Dudu 
 Task Force as Lisa
 Soul City as Relebogile "Riri" Diholo
 Scandal! as Hlengiwe Twala
 Nqobile as Nqobile Nkosi

References

External links
 

Living people
1970 births
South African film actresses
South African television actresses
People from Mpumalanga
South African female models